Peppers TV ,(பெப்பர்ஸ் தொலைக்காட்சி) is an Indian Tamil language general entertainment private broadcast television network that is owned by the Peppers Media Pvt Ltd. The channel currently broadcast from Peppers TV  House, Nandanam, Chennai.

Satellite

References

Television channels and stations established in 2015
Television stations in Chennai
2015 establishments in Tamil Nadu